Bradley Thomas Holman (born February 9, 1968) is an American former professional baseball pitcher.

Playing career
Holman was drafted by the Kansas City Royals in the 35th round of the 1990 Major League Baseball Draft out of Auburn University Montgomery. On April 7, he signed with the Seattle Mariners and was assigned to High-A Peninsula. In 47 games, he had a 6-6 record and a 3.22 ERA. After beginning  with Peninsula, he was promoted to Double-A Jacksonville. In , he made his major league debut after starting the season with the Triple-A Cannons.

Coaching career
In , he served as the pitching coach for the Double-A Altoona Curve in the Pittsburgh Pirates organization. During the 2008 off-season Holman signed a contract with the Texas Rangers organization to coach for the Single-A Hickory Crawdads where he coached through . In  he became pitching coach for the Single-A Myrtle Beach Pelicans where he coached through . Then he was promoted to pitching coach in Triple-A with the Round Rock Express where he coached from  through .

On November 5, 2015, Holman became the bullpen coach for the Texas Rangers. After the 2017 he was replaced as the Rangers' bullpen coach.

Holman was named as the pitching coach for the Syracuse Chiefs for the 2018 season.

Personal life
Holman's brother Brian was also a former professional baseball pitcher who played for the Seattle Mariners of the MLB.

References
https://www.mlb.com/news/texas-rangers-triple-a-round-rock-pitching-coach-brad-holman-builds-relationship-with-his-pitchers/c-5162594

External links

Crawdads Chronicle : Alumni on Minor League Staffs
Venezuelan Professional Baseball League

1968 births
Living people
Amarillo Dillas players
American expatriate baseball players in Canada
Auburn Montgomery Warhawks baseball players
Baseball coaches from Missouri
Baseball players from Kansas City, Missouri
Calgary Cannons players
Eugene Emeralds players
Jacksonville Suns players
Leones del Caracas players
American expatriate baseball players in Venezuela
Major League Baseball bullpen coaches
Major League Baseball pitchers
Minor league baseball coaches
New Haven Ravens players
Peninsula Pilots players
Rochester Red Wings players
Seattle Mariners players
Tacoma Rainiers players
Texas Rangers coaches